Siegfried Balleis (born August 4, 1953) is a German politician, representative of the Christian Social Union of Bavaria.

In 1996 he was elected Oberbürgermeister for the town of Erlangen. He was in office until April 2014. From 1982 to 1993 he was married to Gabriele Pauli.

See also
List of Bavarian Christian Social Union politicians

References

Christian Social Union in Bavaria politicians
1953 births
Living people
Mayors of Erlangen